"She'd Give Anything" is a song written by Jeffrey Steele, Chris Farren and Vince Melamed, and recorded by American country music group Boy Howdy.  It was released in October 1993 as the first single and title track from their EP She'd Give Anything. The song reached number 4 on the Billboard Hot Country Singles & Tracks chart in January 1994.

Music video
The music video was directed by Sara Nichols and premiered in late 1993.

Chart performance

Year-end charts

Gerald Levert version

The song was covered by R&B singer Gerald Levert under the title "I'd Give Anything" as the lead single from his 1994 second album Groove On. His version was produced by David Foster.

Chart performance

Year-end charts

References

1993 singles
1994 singles
1993 songs
Boy Howdy songs
Gerald Levert songs
Songs written by Jeffrey Steele
Songs written by Vince Melamed
Curb Records singles
East West Records singles
Songs written by Chris Farren (country musician)
Song recordings produced by Chris Farren (country musician)
Song recordings produced by David Foster
Pop ballads
Contemporary R&B ballads